Bob Ryan (born 1946) is an American sportswriter.

Bob Ryan may also refer to:
 Bob Ryan (mayor) (born 1963), American municipal politician and businessman
 Bob Ryan (meteorologist), meteorologist in Washington, D.C.
 Bob Ryan (rugby league) (died 2009), rugby league footballer of the 1940s and 1950s for Great Britain, England, and Warrington
 Bob Ryan, a fictional character in the TV series Entourage, portrayed by Martin Landau

See also
 Bobby Ryan (disambiguation)
 Robert Ryan (disambiguation)
 Bob Bryan